Pensacola is a city in the western part of the U.S. state of Florida.

Pensacola may also refer to:

Anthropology
 Pensacola people, a Native American people historically of western Florida
 Pensacola culture, an archaeological culture of the Mississippian period along the Gulf coast of the United States

Entertainment
 Pensacola: Wings of Gold, a television series
 "Pensacola", a 1995 song by Joan Osborne from Relish
 "Pensacola", a 1998 song by Soul Coughing from El Oso
 "Pensacola", a 2011 song by Manchester Orchestra from Simple Math
 "Pensacola", a 2013 song by Deerhunter from "Monomania"

Military
 Naval Air Station Pensacola, a major U.S. Navy base
 USS Pensacola (CA-24), a U.S. Navy heavy cruiser, the lead ship of her class of heavy cruiser
 Pensacola class cruiser, a class of U.S. Navy cruisers

Places
 Pensacola Bay, a bay in Florida
 Pensacola Beach, Florida, an unincorporated community and beach
 Historic Pensacola Village, an area of Pensacola, Florida
 Pensacola, Oklahoma

Other uses
 Pensacola (spider), a genus of jumping spiders
 Pensacola station (disambiguation), stations of the name
 Peniscola, Spain